Population centre, in Canadian census data, is a populated place, or a cluster of interrelated populated places, which meets the demographic characteristics of an urban area, having a population of at least 1,000 people and a population density of no fewer than 400 persons per square km2. The boundaries of a populated place are not necessarily contiguous with municipal boundaries; a population centre may both include areas outside the boundaries of a municipality, if their urban development is directly contiguous, and may exclude areas inside the boundaries of a municipality which are less densely populated. A municipality may also not be classified as a population centre at all, but may simply be part of another municipality's population centre. Accordingly, do not confuse this list with List of municipalities in Quebec, which lists all municipalities by their actual municipal populations.

The term was first introduced in the Canada 2011 Census; prior to that, Statistics Canada used the term urban area.

In the 2021 Census of Population, Statistics Canada listed 273 population centres in the province of Quebec and 2 population centres located in part in Quebec.

See also 
List of cities and towns in Quebec
List of the largest population centres in Canada

References

Lists of populated places in Quebec